Midway, Louisiana may refer to the following places in the U.S. state of Louisiana:
Midway, Bossier Parish, Louisiana, an unincorporated community
Midway, LaSalle Parish, Louisiana, a census-designated place
Midway, Rapides Parish, Louisiana, an unincorporated community
Midway, St. Mary Parish, Louisiana, an unincorporated community
Midway, Webster Parish, Louisiana, an unincorporated community